William Henry McWilliams (November 28, 1910 in Dubuque, Iowa, – January 21, 1997) was a Major League Baseball and National Football League player. He had two at bats for the Boston Red Sox during the 1931 baseball season, and then played for the Detroit Lions in 1934. Attended the University of Iowa. 

He was later player/manager of the Dayton Ducks of the Middle Atlantic League during part of the 1941 season.

External links

1910 births
1997 deaths
Boston Red Sox players
Baseball players from Iowa
Minor league baseball managers
Decatur Commodores players
St. Paul Saints (AA) players
Tulsa Oilers (baseball) players
Springfield Chicks players
Williamsport Grays players
Los Angeles Angels (minor league) players
Dallas Steers players
Memphis Chickasaws players
Hollywood Stars players
Baltimore Orioles (IL) players
Elmira Pioneers players
Dayton Wings players
Springfield Nationals players
Dayton Ducks players
Durham Bulls players
Detroit Lions players
Players of American football from Iowa
People from Dubuque, Iowa